Geoffrey or Geoff Taylor may refer to:

 G. I. Taylor (Geoffrey Ingram Taylor, 1886–1975), British physicist and mathematician
 Geoffrey Taylor (rower) (1890–1915), Canadian rower
 Geoffrey Taylor (cricketer) (born 1949), New Zealand cricketer
 Geoffrey Taylor (sailor) (born 1950), Fijian Olympic sailor
 Geoffrey Phibbs (1900–1956), Irish poet, called himself Geoffrey Taylor
 Geoff Taylor (illustrator) (born 1946), British fantasy illustrator
 Geoff Taylor (singer) (born 1986), Filipino actor and singer
 Geoff Taylor (footballer) (1923–2007), English professional footballer

See also 
 Geoffrey Taylour, 4th Marquess of Headfort (1878–1943), British politician and Army officer
 Jeffrey Taylor (disambiguation)